Samarium(III) oxalate is an inorganic compound, a salt of samarium and oxalic acid with the formula Sm2(C2O4)3. The compound does not dissolve in water, forms a crystalline hydrate with yellow crystals.

Synthesis
Precipitation of soluble samarium salts with oxalic acid:

Also a reaction of samarium nitrate and oxalic acid in an aqueous solution:

Physical properties
Samarium(III) oxalate forms a crystalline hydrate of the composition Sm2(C2O4)3 • 10H2O with yellow crystals.

Chemical properties
Decomposes on heating:

Crystalline hydrate Sm2(C2O4)3 • 10H2O decomposes stepwise.

References

Samarium compounds
Oxalates